Benthocometes is a genus of cusk-eels.

Species
There are currently two recognized species in this genus:
 Benthocometes australiensis J. G. Nielsen, 2010
 Benthocometes robustus (Goode & Bean, 1886)

References

Ophidiidae